Thomas Kouzmanis (born 22 April 1973) is a Canadian former soccer player who played at both professional and international levels.

Kouzmanis played as both a midfielder and a striker.

Career

Club career
Born in East York, Ontario, Kouzmanis spent the 1991 season playing in the CSL with the Nova Scotia Clippers, and then Montreal Supra the next year. and after playing college soccer with the Varsity Blues, returned to the professional game, spending time with the Montreal Impact, the Toronto Lynx, and the Vaughan Sun Devils.

Kouzmanis returned to college soccer with the Varsity Blues in 2003, illegally entering his sixth year of eligibility for college soccer.

International career
Kouzmanis represented Canada at under-17, under-20, under-23 and full international levels.

Kouzmanis participated at the 1989 FIFA U-17 World Championship, the 1995 Caribana Cup, and the 1996 CONCACAF Gold Cup.

References

1973 births
Living people
People from East York, Toronto
Association football midfielders
Association football forwards
Soccer players from Toronto
Canadian soccer players
Canada men's international soccer players
1996 CONCACAF Gold Cup players
Nova Scotia Clippers players
Montreal Impact (1992–2011) players
Toronto Lynx players
Toronto (Mississauga) Olympians players
Canadian Soccer League (1987–1992) players
Canadian Soccer League (1998–present) players
University of Toronto alumni
Canada men's youth international soccer players
Canada men's under-23 international soccer players
York Region Shooters players
Toronto Varsity Blues soccer players
Montreal Supra players